The 2023 NASCAR Whelen Euro Series is the fifteenth Racecar Euro Series season, and the eleventh under the NASCAR Whelen Euro Series branding. The season is scheduled to start on 6 May with the first points race of the season at Circuit Ricardo Tormo and is currently scheduled to end with the All-Star Race at Automotodrom Grobnik on 11 November. 

Alon Day and Liam Hezemans would enter the season as the reigning champions in the EuroNASCAR PRO and EuroNASCAR 2 divisions respectively, although Liam would not defend his title as he moves up to the EuroNASCAR PRO division in 2023. Hendriks Motorsport would enter the season as the defending Team's Champion.

Teams and drivers

EuroNASCAR PRO

EuroNASCAR 2

Confirmed changes

Drivers
 On 5 October 2022, former two-time series champion Anthony Kumpen announced to Autosport.be that he will be returning to the series on a full-time basis in 2023, having previously made his return to the NASCAR Whelen Euro Series during last year's round at Circuit Zolder. It is scheduled to be Kumpen's first full-time season since 2017 and his first planned full-time season participation since 2018, which he was unable to complete after he was suspended for four years by the Royal Automobile Club of Belgium for failing a drug test during the 2018 24 Hours of Zolder.
 On 10 October 2022, Thomas Krasonis announced that he would be leaving the series to compete in the United States in 2023. Krasonis is currently scheduled to make his ARCA Menards Series and NASCAR Craftsman Truck Series debut in 2023 for a currently unannounced team.
 On 28 October 2022, just after the conclusion of the 2022 EuroNASCAR Club Challenge season, Néo Lambert announced his plans to compete in the EuroNASCAR 2 season with SpeedHouse for 2023. The team that he's scheduled to drive for is currently unknown.
 On 5 December 2022, it was announced that Vladimiros Tziortzis will be stepping up to the EuroNASCAR PRO class for 2023. Tziortzis will become the new EuroNASCAR PRO driver of Academy's No. 5 team, replacing Patrick Lemarié whose status for 2023 is currently unknown.
 On 16 January 2023, it was announced that Australian driver Max Mason will be joining the EuroNASCAR 2 championship in 2023. His ride for the season is currently unknown.
 On 9 March 2023, it was announced that reigning EuroNASCAR 2 champion Liam Hezemans will be moving up to the EuroNASCAR PRO division for a full-time switch in 2023. Liam previously competed double duty on both EuroNASCAR PRO and EuroNASCAR 2 in 2022.
 On 15 March 2023, Marko Stipp Motorsport announced that the team has signed German-Brazilian driver Nick Schneider for the 2023 season. Schneider, who competed in the DMV BMW 318ti Cup last year under a Brazilian racing license, is set to compete in the EuroNASCAR 2 division.

Teams
 On 29 December 2022, German automotive tuning firm Bremotion announced their intention to enter NASCAR Whelen Euro Series as a single-car team in 2023. Bremotion will be receiving technical support and cooperation from both Hendriks Motorsport and Team Hezeberg for their debut season.
 On 24 February 2023, Team Bulgaria announced that they will be joining the NASCAR Whelen Euro Series in 2023, fielding the No. 90 Toyota Camry for their debut season.

Schedule
The provisional calendar for the 2023 season was announced on 25 October 2022. All races of the 2023 season will be held on road courses, although the Arctic Ice Race non-championship event would be planned to be held on an ice surface.

EuroNASCAR PRO

EuroNASCAR 2

Calendar changes
 NASCAR Whelen Euro Series was initially scheduled to be hosting NASCAR's first event on ice with the NASCAR Arctic Ice Race, which was initially scheduled to open the season as an exhibition event on 4–5 March. The announcement follows upon what NASCAR Whelen Euro Series had announced last year where the series plans to host a non-championship Winter Classic event at some point between late 2022 and early 2023. However, on 10 January 2023 it was announced that the race was postponed indefinitely due to global supply chain issues. Had the NASCAR Arctic Ice Race went underway, the race would use the following format that was first announced on 3 December 2022:
 A Time Attack tournament was planned to be held on a  track layout on Saturday, with the results of the tournament determined the starting grid for Sunday's event.
 A rallycross-style shootout event was planned to be held on Sunday on a  layout of the track. The shootout would include heat races, semi-finals and finals to determine the overall winner of the event.
 NASCAR GP Germany will be returning to the series after a three-year hiatus. The round will be held on Motorsport Arena Oschersleben for the first time and is currently scheduled to fifth round of the season on 23-24 September.
 NASCAR GP Belgium regained its former status as the final round of the season. Circuit Zolder is scheduled to host EuroNASCAR's season finale for the first time since 2019 and the sixth time in history, having hosted the final round of the season from 2015 to 2019.
 Automotodrom Grobnik loses its status as a championship round and will be scheduled to host an All Star Endurance Race on 11 November.
 NASCAR GP Czech Republic was initially scheduled to be held on 3–4 September, but on 26 November 2022 it was announced that the round will be moved one week ahead to 26–27 August instead.

See also
 2023 NASCAR Cup Series
 2023 NASCAR Xfinity Series
 2023 NASCAR Craftsman Truck Series
 2023 ARCA Menards Series
 2023 ARCA Menards Series East
 2023 ARCA Menards Series West
 2023 NASCAR Pinty's Series
 2023 SRX Series

References

NASCAR Whelen Euro Series seasons
NASCAR
Whelen Euro Series
NASCAR